The Gilfert is a  peak in the Tux Alps. It is the most northerly extent of the Rastkogel Massif and can therefore be seen from almost anywhere in the Lower Inn Valley.

Location and countryside 
The summit bears a large cross, as do the two northwesterly subpeaks (Wetterkreuz) and the northeasterly Sonntagsköpfl (2,244 m). Hollowed out of its eastern flank is Das Kar, a nearly three-quarters enclosed rock basin (Felskessel). It is drained by the Lamarkbach stream into the lower Zillertal valley.

Although the massif of Gilfert-Rastkogel has a very distinctive ridge with many branches, the rock faces are mainly oriented in a north-south direction. This geological feature gives the heavily divided mountain group its own character.

Paths 
The summit of the Gilfert is easily climbed from Innerst near Weerberg (south side of the Inn valley) via the Nonsalm (1,785 m). The route from Innerst to Nonsalm can be climbed as a ski tour or with snow shoes in the winter and spring, because the route is relatively safe from avalanches. A second route runs almost parallel to it from Pill or the district town of Schwaz up to the summit.

Ski region versus nature reserve 
For many years discussions have taken place over whether to develop the Gilfert as a ski region, or designate it as a nature reserve. On the one hand, it has been envisaged for a long while to create a Gilfert-Rastkogel reserve (Ruhegebiet). On the other hand, the Inn valley municipalities around Weer have striven to provide access to the Hochfügen-Hochzillertal ski region, whose facilities would extend to the ridge. A regional planning policy decision about the future of the Central Alps around Hintertux is pending.

See also
 Kellerjoch
 Pangert

External links 

Gilfert ski tour via Hochfügen - route description and photos
 Gilfert mountain tour - route description from Loas Saddle with photos
Gilfert ski tour - route description from Innerst with photos

References 

Mountains of the Alps
Mountains of Tyrol (state)
Two-thousanders of Austria
Tux Alps